The New Jersey “Opioid Antidote Prescription” bill is legislation sponsored in the New Jersey State Senate. The bill, numbered NJ S. 2323, requires a co-prescription of an opioid overdose agent, such as naloxone, with prescriptions for opioid medications for patients who have a high risk of overdosing and tightens restrictions on the dispensing of opioid medications in New Jersey.

Background 
Since the late 1990s the United States has experienced an opiate abuse and addiction epidemic. The epidemic's genesis was the over-prescription of opioid pain medication such as Oxycontin. From 1999 to 2017, more than 399,000 people died from drug overdoses that involved prescription and illicit opioids.

The number one cause of accidental death in the United States is drug overdose. Within that statistic, opioids are the most common drug. Legislation requiring the co-prescription of opioid reversal medication with opioids is a state-based public health measure, and there are laws and pending legislation requiring co-prescription in several states.

Naloxone is a pharmaceutical drug, available by prescription only, that reverses an opioid overdose quickly. Opiate drugs suppress the body's respiratory system, and overdoses are fatal when they stop someone's breathing. Naloxone restores normal respiration in an overdose victim.

Legislation 
Overall, the legislation is designed to reduce harm from opioid prescription drugs. The mandate for a naloxone prescription is one part of the bill; the bill requires medical practitioners to issue an annual prescription for an opioid overdose product (one example is naloxone, in any of the forms approved by the FDA such as injection or nasal spray) to certain patients. These patients include anyone:

 Whose daily opioid prescription is higher than 50 morphine milligram equivalents
 Who has a history of substance use disorder
 Who also has a prescription for a benzodiazepine drug (such as Xanax) at the same time that they have an opioid prescription

Additionally, the bill tightens restrictions on the prescribing of opioids. First, clinicians prescribing an initial opioid prescription to a patient are limited to a 5-day supply. Second, clinicians must follow new requirements before issuing an initial prescription for an opioid which include taking a thorough medical history, doing a physical exam, developing a treatment plan (that includes addressing the cause of the pain), discuss with the patient the risks of addiction to the opioid drug, and enter the patient into a pain management program. The bill gives an exception to these new rules for patients being treated for cancer or who are in hospice care.

Legislative action 
The legislation was introduced in the 219th Legislature session of the New Jersey State Senate on April 9, 2020, by State Senator Vin Gopal. It was referred to the Senate Health, Human Services and Senior Citizens Committee.

Gopal is the youngest member of New Jersey's state Senate.

Gopal has introduced other bills to help combat the opioid crisis. For example, he sponsored S. 52 which requires the Commissioner of Health to create a local team in each county to review drug overdose fatalities.

See also 
 California Naloxone Requirement Bill
 Colorado Harm Reduction Substance Use Disorders Law
 Illinois Opioids-Covid-19-Naloxone Resolution
 New York Mandatory Opioid Antagonist Prescription Bill
 South Carolina Opioid Overdose Prevention Bill

References

External links
 Senator Vin Gopal (D), New Jersey State Legislature

United States state health legislation